Fay Masterson (born 15 April 1974) is an English actress and voice actress. She is best known for her roles as Head Girl in The New Adventures of Pippi Longstocking, Andrea Garnett in The Last Ship and Gail Jones in Fifty Shades Darker (film) and Fifty Shades Freed (film).

Career
Masterson's performance career began as a dancer which she gave up at age 11 after being cast in The New Adventures of Pippi Longstocking. Masterson started her acting career as a child actress at age 14 with her first appearance as Head Girl in "The New Adventures of Pippi Longstocking", a fantasy-adventure, musical, family film based on the books by the late Astrid Lindgren. Fay originally auditioned for the role of Pippi Longstocking, but the role went to her former co-star Tami Erin. Ken Annakin liked her so much that he wrote the part of the head girl at the children's home just for her.
Since then she has appeared in over twenty-five films and over thirty-five television productions. She has additionally voiced characters in several video games.

In 1986 she was interviewed by a stand-in presenter Kenneth Williams on the British tv show Wogan.

These roles include guest appearances on the television series Jupiter Moon (1990 and 1996), Casualty (1993), Game On (1996) and The Ruth Rendell Mysteries (1991).

She has appeared in American films including The Power of One (1992), The Man Without a Face (1993) and A Christmas Carol (2009).
She also was in the role of ship's Chief Engineer, LCDR Andrea Garnett, on TNT's The Last Ship''.

Filmography

Partial television work

Partial video-game work

References

External links 
 
 Fay Masterson at Instagram

English emigrants to the United States
Living people
English child actresses
English film actresses
English television actresses
English voice actresses
English video game actresses
1974 births